Charles Hagan (born 6 September 2001) is an English professional footballer who plays as a forward for Wycombe Wanderers.

Club career
On 2 July 2020, he signed his maiden professional contract with Sheffield Wednesday. A few months later he would make his senior debut coming off the bench in an EFL Cup game against Fulham. At the end of the 2020–21 season, he would be offered a new contract at the club. It was confirmed that he had signed a new deal at the club on 26 June 2021. On 9 September 2021, he joined Hampton & Richmond Borough on loan until the end of January 2022. On 5 January 2022, it was confirmed that Hagan had returned to Sheffield Wednesday following the end of his loan. On 16 March 2022, manager Darren Moore announced he would be leaving the club upon the expiry of his contract.

On 18 August 2022, Hagan joined Wycombe Wanderers.

Career statistics

References

2001 births
Living people
English footballers
Association football forwards
Sheffield Wednesday F.C. players
Hampton & Richmond Borough F.C. players
Wycombe Wanderers F.C. players
English Football League players